Alyssum propinquum is a species of flowering plant in the family Brassicaceae, native to southern Turkey.

References

propinquum
Endemic flora of Turkey
Plants described in 1909